20 College Green is an early 17th-century house located in Gloucester. Together with the associated part of the Abbey Precinct Wall the house is a Grade II* listed building with Historic England. It is located in the precincts of Gloucester Cathedral. The house was begun in 1596, but was altered and added to in the 18th century. The house incorporates the 12th century precinct wall of St Peter's Abbey as well as another wall that lay between the former monk's cemetery to the east and the lay cemetery to the west. 20 College Green was listed as a Grade II* listed building on March 12, 1973.
Its residents have included the musicians Herbert Sumsion and John Sanders.

History
Up until 1768, the precincts of Gloucester Cathedral were divided in two; the area to the east of this wall was known as the Upper College Churchyard, while the area to the west was known as the Lower College Churchyard. A building where 20 College Green stands now was the first to be built in the Upper College Churchyard. The site had been let from the year 1595, when it was leased to one John Brewster, gentleman. Early reports described it as part of the churchyard but  Brewster's land evidently caused some consternation. At the 1613 visitation, when asked whether anyone had encroached or put a garden on any area of the churchyard where burials had formerly taken place, the reply was that there were now two enclosures of such nature,

References 

Grade II* listed buildings in Gloucestershire
Buildings and structures in Gloucester